Clifford "Cliff" Pu (born June 3, 1998) is a Canadian professional Ice hockey forward who is currently playing with Kunlun Red Star in the Kontinental Hockey League (KHL). He was selected 69th overall in the 2016 NHL Entry Draft by the Buffalo Sabres.

Playing career

Youth
Pu played at the AAA hockey level since the Atom age group. He was named an International Silverstick Atom AAA All Star in 2009. In his final year of minor ice hockey, he played for the Toronto Marlboros Minor Midget AAA team. He was seen as one of the top prospects in the 2014 OHL Priority Selection after finishing 4th on his team in points.

Junior
Pu was drafted in the 1st round, 16th overall, in the 2014 OHL Priority Selection by the Oshawa Generals. He appeared in 17 games with the Generals, scoring 2 goals and adding an assist. On January 1, 2015, Pu was traded to the London Knights along with Josh Sterk and 3 draft picks, in exchange for Michael McCarron and Dakota Mermis. In the 24 games he appeared in for the London Knights following the trade, Pu scored 4 goals and added 2 assists.

In his first complete season with the Knights, Pu scored 12 goals and 19 assists. In the following season, he greatly improved on his totals, leading the Knights in regular season scoring. On January 3, 2018, the Knights traded Pu to the Kingston Frontenacs for Nathan Dunkley and draft picks.

Professional
In 2016, Cliff Pu became eligible for the 2016 NHL Entry Draft. He was the eighty-third ranked North American skater by the NHL's Scouting Service. He was drafted in the third round, 69th overall, by the Buffalo Sabres. On October 23, 2017, Pu signed a three-year, entry-level contract with the Sabres.

Pu was traded to the Carolina Hurricanes on August 2, 2018, along with future draft picks (2nd-round (2019), and a 3rd-round and a 6th-round (2020)) in exchange for forward Jeff Skinner.

After attending the Hurricanes 2018 training camp, Pu was assigned to begin the 2018–19 season, with Carolina's AHL affiliate the Charlotte Checkers. Pu struggled to translate his offensive game to the professional level and was re-assigned to ECHL affiliate, the Florida Everblades, on February 9, 2019. After scoring at a point-per-game through 5 appearances with the Everblades, Pu was returned to the AHL. Having contributed with 1 goal and 6 points in 44 games with Charlotte, Pu was traded by the Hurricanes to the Florida Panthers in exchange for future considerations, which correlated with the Checkers acquisition of Tomas Jurco, on February 25, 2019.

On October 8, 2020, Pu was traded for the third time during his entry-level contract by the Panthers to the Columbus Blue Jackets in exchange for Markus Nutivaara.

With his contract concluded with the Blue Jackets, Pu was not tendered a qualifying offer and was released as a free agent. On August 13, 2021, with limited opportunity in North America, Pu embarked on a European career in agreeing to a one-year contract with Austrian based club, Vienna Capitals of the ICEHL.

Personal life
Pu was born in North York, Ontario and was raised in Richmond Hill, Ontario.

Career statistics

Regular season and playoffs

International

References

External links
 
 

1998 births
Living people
Buffalo Sabres draft picks
Canadian ice hockey centres
Canadian sportspeople of Chinese descent
Charlotte Checkers (2010–) players
Cleveland Monsters players
Florida Everblades players
Greenville Swamp Rabbits players
Kingston Frontenacs players
HC Kunlun Red Star players
London Knights players
Oshawa Generals players
Springfield Thunderbirds players
Sportspeople from North York
Ice hockey people from Toronto